The Shire of Bulloo is a local government area in South West Queensland, Australia.

On 17 April 2020 the Queensland Government reorganised the nine localities in the Shire, resulting in six localities by making the following changes:

Thargomindah, previously being the surrounding area around the town of Thargomindah, was enlarged through the incorporation of most of Bullawarra (except for a small portion in the south of Bullawarra), all of Dynevor and all of Norley.
Bulloo Downs gained the small portion from the south of Bullawarra (the rest being incorporated into Thargomindah) and lost a small portion of its western land to the locality of Cameron Corner.
Cameron Corner gained a small portion of land from the west of the Bulloo Downs.
Nockatunga was renamed Noccundra after the only town in the locality.

There were no changes to the localities of Durham and Hungerford.

Geography 
The Shire is located where New South Wales, Queensland and South Australia meet. In the south west corner of the shire, Cameron Corner is the point on the borders of all three states.

Major industries in the shire include wool, beef, opals, oil and natural gas.

History

The Shire's traditional land owners were the Galali people.

Paroo Division was established on 11 November 1879 as one of the original divisions proclaimed under the Divisional Boards Act 1879.
On 3 June 1880, the western part of the Paroo Division was separated to create the Bulloo Division.

On 21 June 1883, the boundaries between Diamantina Division and Bulloo Division were adjusted.

With the passage of the Local Authorities Act 1902, Bulloo Division became the Shire of Bulloo on 31 March 1903.

On 17 July 1930 Shire of Bulloo was abolished and absorbed into Shire of Quilpie, but was re-instated on 4 July 1931.

On 17 April 2020 the Queensland Government reorganised the nine localities in the Shire, resulting in six localities by making the following changes:

 Thargomindah, previously being the surrounding area around the town of Thargomindah, was enlarged through the incorporation of most of Bullawarra (except for a small portion in the south of Bullawarra), all of Dynevor and all of Norley
 Bulloo Downs gained the small portion from the south of Bullawarra (the rest being incorporated into Thargomindah) and lost a small portion of its western land to the locality of Cameron Corner
 Cameron Corner gained a small portion of land from the west of the Bulloo Downs
 Nockatunga was renamed Noccundra after the only town in the locality

There were no changes to the localities of Durham and Hungerford.

Towns and localities
The Shire of Bulloo includes the following towns and localities:

 Thargomindah (town and locality)
Bulloo Downs (locality)
 Cameron Corner (locality)
 Durham (locality) containing the abandoned town of Oontoo
 Hungerford (town and locality)
 Noccundra (town and locality)
Since April 2020, there are three former localities and one former locality name:

 Bullawarra (former locality)
 Dynevor (former locality)
 Nockatunga (former locality name)
 Norley (former locality)

Amenities 
Bulloo Shire Council operates a public library in Thargomindah.

Chairmen and mayors
 1927: J. Cordner
 2008–present: John Charles Sidney (Tractor) Ferguson

Population

References

 
Local government areas of Queensland
South West Queensland
1880 establishments in Australia